Voice – The Best of Tour was a Concert tour by British singer-songwriter Beverley Knight, organised to support the album Voice - The Best of Beverley Knight. It began on 9 November 2006 in Cardiff and ended on 6 December 2006 in Plymouth.

Set list
 "Good Morning World" (Intro)
 "Made It Back"
 "Get Up"
 "Flavour of the Old School"
 "After You"
 "Supersonic"
 "Same (As I Ever Was)"
 "Piece of My Heart"
 "Shape of You" (acoustic)
 "Sista Sista" (acoustic)
 "The Need of You" (acoustic)
 "Greatest Day"
 "Black Butta"
 "Rock Steady"
 "Gold"
 "Shoulda Woulda Coulda"Encore:
 "Keep This Fire Burning"
 "Come as You Are"

Footnotes:
On numerous nights at the start of the tour, the final song performed was "Angels".

Personnel

Vocals
Beverley Knight – vocals
Me'sha Bryan – backing vocals
Bryan Chambers – backing vocals
Billie Godfrey – backing vocals

Band
Paul Reid – Guitars / Musical Director
Ashley Kingsley – keyboards
Darren Abraham – drums
Paul Bruce – bass

Management
Andy Bernstein – Tour Manager
Keely Myers – production manager
Richard "Wez" Wearing – stage manager

Additional personnel
Dennie Vidal – FOH engineer
Steven Abbiss – lighting design
Simon Piggy Lynch – lighting crew chief
Craig Pryde – PA tech
Rob Webster Reed – monitor engineer

Tour dates

External links
Guardian review of Hammersmith Apollo gig 
The Times review of Hammersmith Apollo gig 
Manchester Evening News review of Manchester gig 
Express and Star review of Wolverhampton gig

Beverley Knight concert tours
2006 concert tours